Kiira Young Football Club, or short Kiira Young FC, is a Ugandan football club from Kampala.

They play in the top division of Ugandan football, the Ugandan Super League.

Stadium
Currently the team plays at the 45,200 seater Mandela National Stadium.

External links
Soccerway

Football clubs in Uganda